Petters Group Worldwide was an American diversified company based in Minnetonka, Minnesota that was turned into a $3.65 billion Ponzi scheme by its founder and CEO, Tom Petters. It had 3,200 employees and investments or full ownership in 60 companies, of which it actively managed 20, with offices in North America, South America, Asia, and Europe. Among its assets were Sun Country Airlines, Petters Warehouse Direct, and the remnants of Polaroid. Petters Group Worldwide had $2.3 billion in revenue in 2007.

On September 24, 2008, its headquarters and the homes of its top executives and some associated businesses were raided by the FBI. Wiretaps based on information gleaned from a confidential co-conspirator are alleged to detail the existence of a $2 billion investment fraud. The allegations include creating phony purchase orders from Sam's Club and BJ's to create the appearance of tremendous sales of merchandise. CEO Tom Petters is the central figure in the investigation. A federal court appointed Doug Kelley, a lawyer, as receiver for the Petters companies, excluding bankrupt Sun Country.

On October 13, 2008, Petters Group Worldwide filed for Chapter 11 bankruptcy. On December 2, 2009, Tom Petters was convicted on all counts related to this Ponzi scheme. On April 8, 2010, Thomas J. Petters was sentenced to 50 years in federal prison for all counts related to running the Ponzi scheme.

In early November 2010, the Hennepin County attorney's office filed drug possession charges against former Petters Group General Counsel David Baer, based on a safe full of illegal drugs under his office desk allegedly found by federal agents during the September 24, 2008 raid. Baer subsequently received three years' criminal probation for three felony drug convictions. He also received three years' probation from the Minnesota Supreme Court pursuant to a complaint from the Office of Lawyers Professional Responsibility.

References

2008 in economics
Companies based in Minnetonka, Minnesota
Companies that filed for Chapter 11 bankruptcy in 2008
Corporate scandals
Criminal investigation
Great Recession
Pyramid and Ponzi schemes